Moirangthem Loken Meitei (born 4 May 1997) is an Indian professional footballer who plays as a midfielder or winger for Real Kashmir in the I-League.

Career
Loken started his career with the youth set-up at Royal Wahingdoh before joining Shillong First Division side Shillong United for the 2014 season on loan.

He made his professional debut for Royal Wahingdoh in the I-League on 27 January 2015 against Bharat FC, coming on as a 93rd-minute substitute for Bekay Bewar as Royal Wahingdoh won 2–1.

Kerala Blasters
On 23 July 2017, Meitei was selected in the 13th round of the 2017–18 ISL Players Draft by the Kerala Blasters for the 2017–18 Indian Super League season. He made his debut for the club on 9 December 2017 against Goa. He started and played 62 minutes as Kerala Blasters lost 5–2.

Career statistics

Club

References

1997 births
Living people
Indian footballers
Footballers from Manipur
Royal Wahingdoh FC players
Kerala Blasters FC players
East Bengal Club players
Association football midfielders
I-League players
Indian Super League players
Real Kashmir FC players
TRAU FC players
Kerala Blasters FC Reserves and Academy players